Torch relay may refer to: 
The carrying of the Olympic Torch
Any of the Olympic torch relays
Pan American Torch, a torch relay associated with the Panamerican Games
Asian Games Torch, a torch relay associated with the Asian Games